Strindheim Idrettslag is a Norwegian multisports club located in Trondheim. It has sections for athletics, handball, football, speed skating, and cross-country skiing. The cross-country ski team has several world cup competitors (see separate article for Petter Northug). The football team currently plays in the 3. divisjon after being promoted from 4. divisjon in 2018.

Football team
Strindheim's football team competed in the top tier of Norwegian football in 1984 and 1995. Strindheim relegated from 2. divisjon in 2011 and promoted back to the third tier the following season. They were again relegated to 3. divisjon in 2013 and was promoted to 2. divisjon in 2014. The team was relegated from 2. divisjon in 2016 and again relegated in 2017. The football team currently plays in the 3. divisjon after being promoted from 4. divisjon in 2018.

Recent history 
{|class="wikitable"
|-bgcolor="#efefef"
! Season
! 
! Pos.
! Pl.
! W
! D
! L
! GS
! GA
! P
!Cup
!Notes
|-
|2006
|2. divisjon
|align=right|5
|align=right|26||align=right|12||align=right|4||align=right|10
|align=right|53||align=right|48||align=right|40
||Second round
|
|-
|2007
|2. divisjon
|align=right|4
|align=right|26||align=right|15||align=right|4||align=right|7
|align=right|69||align=right|40||align=right|49
||Second round
|
|-
|2008
|2. divisjon
|align=right|8
|align=right|26||align=right|10||align=right|7||align=right|9
|align=right|49||align=right|44||align=right|37
||First round
|
|-
|2009
|2. divisjon
|align=right|10
|align=right|26||align=right|11||align=right|1||align=right|14
|align=right|41||align=right|48||align=right|34
||Third round
|
|-
|2010
|2. divisjon
|align=right |7
|align=right|26||align=right|8||align=right|9||align=right|9
|align=right|33||align=right|42||align=right|33
||Second round
|
|-
|2011 
|2. divisjon
|align=right bgcolor="#FFCCCC"| 13
|align=right|26||align=right|5||align=right|6||align=right|15
|align=right|39||align=right|68||align=right|21
||First round
|Relegated to the 3. divisjon
|-
|2012
|3. divisjon
|align=right bgcolor=#DDFFDD| 1
|align=right|26||align=right|22||align=right|2||align=right|2
|align=right|81||align=right|27||align=right|68
||First round
|Promoted to the 2. divisjon
|-
|2013
|2. divisjon
|align=right bgcolor="#FFCCCC"| 12
|align=right|26||align=right|6||align=right|5||align=right|15
|align=right|51||align=right|60||align=right|23
||Second round
|Relegated to the 3. divisjon
|-
|2014 
|3. divisjon
|align=right bgcolor=#DDFFDD| 1
|align=right|26||align=right|23||align=right|1||align=right|2
|align=right|97||align=right|25||align=right|70
||First round
|Promoted to the 2. divisjon
|-
|2015 
|2. divisjon
|align=right |9
|align=right|26||align=right|8||align=right|9||align=right|9
|align=right|38||align=right|36||align=right|33
||Second round
|
|-
|2016 
|2. divisjon
|align=right bgcolor="#FFCCCC"| 10
|align=right|26||align=right|8||align=right|6||align=right|12
|align=right|50||align=right|60||align=right|30
||First round
|Relegated to the 3. divisjon
|-
|2017 
|3. divisjon
|align=right bgcolor="#FFCCCC"| 12
|align=right|26||align=right|9||align=right|5||align=right|12
|align=right|53||align=right|64||align=right|32
||First round
|Relegated to the 4. divisjon
|-
|2018 
|4. divisjon
|align=right bgcolor=#DDFFDD| 1
|align=right|22||align=right|18||align=right|1||align=right|3
|align=right|111||align=right|32||align=right|55
||First round
|Promoted to the 3. divisjon
|-
|2019 
|3. divisjon
|align=right| 2
|align=right|26||align=right|14||align=right|4||align=right|8
|align=right|59||align=right|46||align=right|46
||Second qualifying round
|
|}

References

External links
 Official website
 Official website (ski section)
 Official website (football section)

Football clubs in Norway
Eliteserien clubs
Sport in Trondheim
Association football clubs established in 1948
Athletics clubs in Norway
Norwegian handball clubs
1948 establishments in Norway
Multi-sport clubs in Norway